Ulster Championship may refer to a number of Gaelic games competitions in Ulster:

Inter-county Gaelic football competitions:
Ulster Senior Football Championship
Ulster Under-21 Football Championship
Ulster Minor Football Championship
Ulster Junior Football Championship
Club Gaelic football competitions:
Ulster Senior Club Football Championship
Ulster Intermediate Club Football Championship
Ulster Junior Club Football Championship
Ulster Minor Club Football Championship
Inter-county hurling competitions:
Ulster Senior Hurling Championship
Ulster Under-21 Hurling Championship
Ulster Minor Hurling Championship
Ulster Intermediate Hurling Championship
Ulster Junior Hurling Championship
Club hurling competitions:
Ulster Senior Club Hurling Championship
Ulster Intermediate Club Hurling Championship
Ulster Junior Club Hurling Championship
Ulster Minor Club Hurling Championship

See also
Ulster GAA